Versailles is a village in Brown County, Illinois, United States. The population was 446 at the 2020 census. The village's name is pronounced differently from the French city of the same name:  .

Geography
Versailles is located at  (39.883896, -90.657630).

Demographics

As of the 2020 census there were 446 people, 183 households, and 109 families residing in the village. The racial makeup of the village was 96.86% White, 0.67% African American, and 2.47% from two or more races. Hispanic or Latino of any race were 0.45% of the population.

There were 183 households, out of which 49.73% had children under the age of 18 living with them, 54.64% were married couples living together, 4.92% had a female householder with no husband present, and 40.44% were non-families. 38.80% of all households were made up of individuals, and 21.31% had someone living alone who was 65 years of age or older. The average household size was 3.10 and the average family size was 2.32.

The village's age distribution consisted of 24.1% under the age of 18, 0.7% from 18 to 24, 29.2% from 25 to 44, 24.5% from 45 to 64, and 21.5% who were 65 years of age or older. The median age was 37.9 years. For every 100 females, there were 106.8 males. For every 100 females age 18 and over, there were 96.3 males.

The median income for a household in the village was $49,375, and the median income for a family was $62,083. Males had a median income of $53,015 versus $27,679 for females. The per capita income for the village was $24,881. About 9.2% of families and 12.0% of the population were below the poverty line, including 3.9% of those under age 18 and 26.4% of those age 65 or over.

Notable person

 Bill Roy, skeet shooting Olympian and world champion; born in Versailles

References

Villages in Brown County, Illinois
Villages in Illinois